The Sakhalin vole (Microtus sachalinensis) is a species of rodent in the family Cricetidae.
It is found only in Russia.

References

Musser, G. G. and M. D. Carleton. 2005. Superfamily Muroidea. pp. 894–1531 in Mammal Species of the World a Taxonomic and Geographic Reference. D. E. Wilson and D. M. Reeder eds. Johns Hopkins University Press, Baltimore.

Microtus
Mammals described in 1955
Mammals of Russia
Taxonomy articles created by Polbot